Ragnar Hargreaves (22 March 1907 – 18 February 1965) was a Norwegian sailor.

Biography
He was born in Kristiania and represented the Royal Norwegian Yacht Club in that city. He competed at the 1948 Summer Olympics in London, where he placed fourth in the 6 metre class, together with Magnus Konow, Anders Evensen, Håkon Solem and Lars Musæus.

Musæus was also his brother-in-law, whereas Hargreaves also was a son-in-law of Magnus Konow and brother-in-law of Karsten Konow.

References

1907 births
1965 deaths
Sportspeople from Oslo
Norwegian male sailors (sport)
Olympic sailors of Norway
Sailors at the 1948 Summer Olympics – 6 Metre